Philippe Lefebvre (born 17 December 1968) is a French actor and screenwriter. He performed in more than fifty films since 1981.

Rabid Grannies 
Phillip Lefebvre worked as the Music Mixer on the film, Rabid Grannies. Music Mixers  are tasked with making the original music in the film (provided by Jean-Bruno Castelain and Pierre-Damien Castelain) sound professional. This can be achieved by simply adjusting the volume of different musical elements of the score. However, it can quickly become more complex depending on the type of music used. Phillip has an extensive filmography, working on The Judge (1984) as director and writer, Antoine Rives, juge de terrorisme (1993) directing five episodes. He also directed an episode of C’est votre historie in 2007 and directed and wrote the screenplay for Une suit (2012). His only music mixing credit is for Rabid Grannies.

Selected filmography

References

External links 
 
 Agency entry

1970s births
Living people
French male film actors
French male television actors